The UK Petroleum Industry Association (UKPIA) is a trade body representing downstream companies in the oil and gas sector in the UK. The current Chief Executive is Elizabeth de Jong.

The trade body's website says that "we and our members are committed to taking a leadership role in shaping a flexible and resilient fuels future for UK industry and ensuring the downstream fuels sector continues to play a part in tomorrow's sustainable, energy-secure landscape".

In written evidence to Parliament in 2021, UKPIA said that it represents "eight oil refining, distribution and marketing companies that operate the six major oil refineries in the UK and source over 85% of the transport fuels used. UKPIA members also own and operate multiple oil terminals and oil pipelines".

UKPIA publishes reviews and statistical studies about the downstream oil industries in the UK.

Lobbying allegations 
In February 2022, The Guardian published a report alleging that lobbyists representing fossil fuel giants were running All-Party Parliamentary Groups (APPGs) to give oil producers a voice in parliament without having to declare an interest. The report notes that UKPIA "is playing a key role in the running of the All-Party Parliamentary Group (APPG) on downstream energy and fuels", which gave the association's members access to MPs, for example by hosting presentations by UKPIA members like BP and Phillips 66.

Following an investigation by the Office of the Registrar of Consultant Lobbyists concluded that "Based on assurances given, UKPIA has not conducted consultant lobbying activities."

References

Petroleum organizations